K. M. M. B. Kulatunga was the 32nd Solicitor General of Sri Lanka. He was appointed on 1982, succeeding V. C. Gunatilleke, and held the office until 1989. He was succeeded by S. W. B Wadugodapitiya.

References

K